Michael James Worman (born May 1, 1945) is a former Tokyo-based American voice actor who did work for Frontier Enterprises.

Characterized by his distinct high-pitched voice, he did voice acting work for the company from sometime in the mid 1970s until its closure in 2000 (with his last credited role being Pierre Simon in Covert Ops: Nuclear Dawn). Aside from his acting career, Worman also co-authored the book Practical Thai Cooking with Puangkram Smith in 1985. He since retired back to his native Wisconsin.

Filmography

Anime Dubbing

OVAs & Specials 

 Rain Boy (1989) - Father

Anime Films 

 Lupin the 3rd: The Mystery of Mamo (1978) - Mamo (Frontier Dub)
 Cyborg 009: The Legend of the Super Galaxy (1980) - Dr. Cosmo
 Voltus 5 (1980) - Zuhl
 Space Warrior Baldios (1981) - Dr. Carter
 Swan Lake (1981) - Minister (Frontier Dub)
 Aladdin & the Wonderful Lamp (1982) - Sultan (Frontier Dub)
 Arcadia of My Youth (1982) - Triter

Video Games 
 Chase the Express (2000) - Pierre Simon

References 
 Content in this article was copied from Mike Worman at Dubbing Wikia, which is licensed under the Creative Commons Attribution-Share Alike 3.0 (Unported) (CC-BY-SA 3.0) license.

External links 

 
 

1945 births
Living people
People from Antigo, Wisconsin
Male actors from Wisconsin
American male voice actors
American expatriates in Japan
20th-century American male actors
21st-century American male actors
American male video game actors